Chickasaw Bayou is a stream in the U.S. state of Mississippi. It is a tributary to the Yazoo River.

Chickasaw Bayou derives its name from the Chickasaw tribe.

The Battle of Chickasaw Bayou was fought near this stream in 1862.

References

Rivers of Mississippi
Bodies of water of Warren County, Mississippi
Mississippi placenames of Native American origin